Seoul Pabal FC was a South Korean soccer club based in Eunpyeong-gu, Seoul. It was a member of the K3 League, an amateur league and the third tier of league football in South Korea.

The club competed in the 2007 K3 League season as Eunpyeong Chung-goo Sungshim Hospital before changing its name to Seoul Pabal ahead of the 2008 season.

After the 2008 season, the club was closed due to it being proved that some players engaged in the manipulation of the game.

External links
 Seoul Pabal FC Naver cafe

Association football clubs established in 2007
Association football clubs disestablished in 2008
K3 League (2007–2019) clubs
C
Football clubs in Seoul
2007 establishments in South Korea
2008 disestablishments in South Korea
Sport in Seoul